Matthew Mark Meyer (born 4 March 1998) is a South African swimmer. He competed in the men's 1500 metre freestyle event at the 2016 Summer Olympics. He finished 41st in the heats with a time of 15:36.22. He did not qualify for the final. Meyer went to school at Clifton College, Durban.

References

External links
 

1998 births
Living people
South African male swimmers
Olympic swimmers of South Africa
Swimmers at the 2016 Summer Olympics
Place of birth missing (living people)
20th-century South African people
21st-century South African people